Merger (foaled 1965 in Alberta) is a Canadian Thoroughbred racehorse best known for winning the 1968 Queen's Plate, Canada's most prestigious horse race.

Merger was bred and raced by Golden West Farms, a partnership of prominent Canadian businessmen, Frank McMahon and Max Bell.

References
 Merger's pedigree and partial racing stats

1965 racehorse births
Racehorses bred in Canada
Racehorses trained in Canada
King's Plate winners
Thoroughbred family 3-i